Le Suchet (1,588 m) is a mountain of the Jura range, located south of Baulmes in the canton of Vaud.

The summit of Le Suchet can be reached easily by several trails and a road culminating at 1,489 metres.

References

External links

Le Suchet on Hikr

Mountains of Switzerland
Mountains of the canton of Vaud
Mountains of the Jura
Suchet